Gur Sefid (also Romanized as Gūr Sefīd; also known as Garagān-e Gūr-e Sefīd is a village in Howmeh Rural District, in the Central District of Gilan-e Gharb County, Kermanshah Province, Iran. At the 2006 census, its population was 811, in 181 families.

References 

Populated places in Gilan-e Gharb County